The South Oman Salt Basin or SOSB is a sedimentary basin located in the Sultanate of Oman, at the southeastern edge of the Arabian Peninsula. The basin is well-known for being one of the oldest commercial deposits in the world. Oil in SOBS is associated with source rocks of the Neoproterozoic to Cambrian Huqf Supergroup. 
In 1937, the first operating license in South Oman was awarded to Petroleum Development Oman and Dhofar. In 1976, the discovery of moveable oil in Nasir-1 boost the carbonate intrasalt stringer exploration. However, as the difficulty in delivering expected reserves was greater than expected, the deposits became dormant in 1986.

References

Geology of Oman